Daniel Maurice Dutuel (born 10 December 1967) is a French former professional footballer who played as an attacking midfielder.

Over the course of 11 seasons, he amassed Ligue 1 totals of 296 games and 37 goals. He also played three years in Spain.

Football career
Born in Bort-les-Orgues, Corrèze, Dutuel was a product of the famous AJ Auxerre youth system, which also included Basile Boli, Eric Cantona, William Prunier and Pascal Vahirua, all under the tutelage of legendary Guy Roux. He made his first-team – and Ligue 1 – debut on 16 July 1985 in a 0–0 away draw against Stade Lavallois (aged not yet 18), and was already an undisputed starter by the time the side reached the semifinals of the UEFA Cup in 1992–93.

After a spell at Olympique de Marseille Dutuel moved to FC Girondins de Bordeaux, which he helped to the 1996 edition of the UEFA Cup final, where he scored the club's only goal in an eventual 1–5 aggregate loss to FC Bayern Munich. Whilst at Bordeaux he won the 1995 UEFA Intertoto Cup.

Dutuel then moved to Spain where, safe for the 1996–97 season with Celta de Vigo, he was highly unsuccessful. He also represented Real Valladolid in that country (still in La Liga), and closed out his career two years later after stints with AC Bellinzona (Switzerland) and RCF Paris.

References

External links
AJ Auxerre stats 
AJ Auxerre archives 

Celta de Vigo biography 

1967 births
Living people
Sportspeople from Corrèze
French footballers
Association football midfielders
Ligue 1 players
AJ Auxerre players
Olympique de Marseille players
FC Girondins de Bordeaux players
Racing Club de France Football players
La Liga players
RC Celta de Vigo players
Real Valladolid players
AC Bellinzona players
French expatriate footballers
Expatriate footballers in Spain
Expatriate footballers in Switzerland
French expatriate sportspeople in Spain
Footballers from Nouvelle-Aquitaine